Gaston Redon (28 October 1853 – 20 November 1921) was a French architect, teacher, and graphic artist.

Biography
Redon was born in Bordeaux, Aquitaine to a prosperous family, the younger brother of Odilon Redon.  Gaston attended the École des Beaux-Arts in the atelier of Louis-Jules André, and took the Prix de Rome for architecture in 1883.  This entitled him to three years at the Villa Medici from 1884 to 1887, where he met and became friends with the composer Claude Debussy.  

After his return to Paris, Redon was made the official architect of the Louvre.  The rebuilding and expansion of the Pavillon de Marsan (the most northwestern wing of the palace) between 1900 and 1905 to accommodate the Museum of Decorative Arts amounts to his major built work.  

Redon was elected to the Académie des Beaux-Arts in May 1914, and, jointly with Alfred-Henri Recoura, ran an architecture atelier at the Ecole.  His students included French architects Henri Marchal, Roger-Henri Expert, and Louis-Hippolyte Boileau among others.

Works
His work includes:  

 the tomb of César Franck, Montparnasse Cemetery, 1894
 the casino at Royan, 1895 (destroyed 1945)
 Museum of Decorative Arts, Pavillon de Marsan, Louvre, 1900–1905

Sources 
 online biography (in French)

1853 births
1921 deaths
19th-century French architects
20th-century French architects
Prix de Rome for architecture
Members of the Académie des beaux-arts
École des Beaux-Arts alumni
Architects from Bordeaux
Burials at Montparnasse Cemetery